Stronach Group, doing business as 1/ST, is an entertainment and real estate company in North America with Thoroughbred horse racing and pari-mutuel wagering at the core.

History
The Stronach Group entered the horse racing industry by purchasing Magna Entertainment Corporation's former holdings from MI Developments. In January 2020, the company announced a rebranding to the 1/ST banner for all consumer-facing operations.

Magna Entertainment Corporation
Magna Entertainment Corporation (MEC) was created in 1999 by parent company Magna International Inc. Magna International, a major automotive supplier based in Ontario, Canada, underwent a corporate reorganization in which its non-automotive businesses and interests were transferred to MEC. In March 2000, Magna International distributed shares in its new division to its current stockholders, establishing MEC as a separate public company. Magna Entertainment filed for Chapter 11 bankruptcy.

Stronach Group today
Stronach Group currently owns or manages racetracks in North America, including many thoroughbred tracks and two mixed (thoroughbred and standardbred) tracks. Stronach Group also operates the simulcasting venues at these tracks, as well as OTB (Off-track betting) facilities.

Other ventures include Xpressbet, a wagering business that allows customers to wager on over 100 horse racing tracks via internet or telephone

Stronach Group also owns thoroughbred training facilities in conjunction with its racetracks in California, Florida, and Maryland, and owns and operates facilities that manufacture a straw-based bedding product, StreuFex.

In 2004, voters in Oklahoma approved legislation that allowed Stronach Group to add slot machines at Remington Park racetrack in Oklahoma City. Remington Park opened its casino, featuring 650 Class II gaming machines, in November 2005. Gulfstream Park in Hallandale Beach, Florida, followed suit in November 2006, with 516 slot machines and poker. 

In 2006, under what was Magna Entertainment Corporation completed its purchase of AmTote International, who provide totalizator services to the horse racing industry. On March 23, 2010 an agreement was reached to sell the two Maryland Jockey Club tracks (Pimlico and Laurel Park) from Magna Entertainment Corporation to its parent company MI Developments. MI Developments received the tracks from M.E.C. in exchange for paying $25 million in cash for claims to Maryland Jockey Club creditors and $89 million to other creditors through a new reorganization plan. The U.S. Bankruptcy Court in Delaware, had until April 30 to approve Magna's reorganization plan.

Owned racetracks and assets
Stronach Group owns the following tracks in order of acquisition date:

Race tracks
 Santa Anita Park, Arcadia, California. Acquired in December 1998 for $126 million.
 Gulfstream Park, Hallandale Beach, Florida.  Acquired in September 1999 for $95 million.
 Golden Gate Fields, Albany, California.  Acquired in December 1999 for $77 million.
 Pimlico Race Course, Baltimore, Maryland.  Acquired 51% in November 2002 for $117.5 million (as part of MJC package) and an additional 20% for $18.3 million in September 2007.
 Laurel Park Racecourse, Laurel, Maryland.  Acquired 58% in November 2002 for $117.5 million (as part of MJC package) and an additional 20% for $18.3 million in September 2007.
 Rosecroft Raceway, Fort Washington, Maryland. Acquired in August 2016.

Other assets
 AmTote International, Hunt Valley, Maryland. A leading totalisator service provider with technological advancements in the pari-mutuel wagering industry. Magna acquired 30% for $3.82 million in August 2003 and acquired the balance of 70% in July 2006 for $14 million.
 Bowie Race Track, Bowie, Maryland, ceased racing operations in July 1985 prior to Magna's acquisition, the track now serves as a training center for Thoroughbred racehorses.
 Maryland Turf Caterers, Inc., Baltimore, Maryland. Acquired the caterers for $12.1 million in September 2005. MTC conducts on or off-premises catering services and also operate the Food & Beverage operations at Pimlico and Laurel.
 Palm Meadows Thoroughbred Training Center, Boynton Beach, Florida, built at a cost of $90 million on 304 acres (1.23 km2). The center opened in November 2002 as the largest training center in the United States.
 Xpressbet, Washington, Pennsylvania, was launched by Magna in March 2002 is a legal, licensed, U.S.-based account wagering provider that offers pari-mutuel wagering on thoroughbred, harness and quarter horse racing events either online or by telephone.
 TrackNet Media, Louisville, Kentucky, is a media company owned by Churchill and Magna that acts as a horse racing content provider and it negotiates Advance Deposit Wagering contracts and simulcast agreements with racetracks, including those owned by Churchill or Magna.
 STREUfex, Finley, New South Wales, Australia. A company that manufactures horse bedding made from pelletised straw.
  of land, in Porter, New York. Magna is attempting to sell the land where they had proposed to build a track. The asking price is believed to be $960,000.
 Dixon Downs, Dixon, California. Acquired in December 2000 Magna bought  of land approximately 20 minutes west of Sacramento off I-80.
 The Village at Gulfstream Park, Hallandale Beach, Florida. Magna owns 50% interest (in conjunction with Forest City Enterprises) of the first phase of the development, scheduled for completion in February 2010, there will be more than 70 specialty shops, restaurants and outdoor cafes. Office space will also be available above a portion of the retail buildings.
 XpressBet TV (XBTV), Arcadia, California, is a free online horse racing network that features live and video-on-demand coverage of thoroughbred races primarily from tracks operated by Stronach Group. Many of the people who work at XBTV were formerly with the Stronach-owned HRTV network before it was sold to Betfair/TVG.

Former MI Developments Inc. or MEC assets and racetracks 
 Portland Meadows, Portland, Oregon.  Acquired in October 2001 for $4.78 million (80% of $5.97 million package).
 Bay Meadows Racetrack, San Mateo, California (near San Francisco); Magna acquired (racing and operating rights) in August 2000 for $24.1 million, agreement expired in December 2004.
 Flamboro Downs, Hamilton, Ontario. Acquired in June 2002 for $46.2, sold to Great Canadian Gaming Corp. for a total of $63.9 million in August 2005.
 Maryland-Virginia Racing Circuit, New Kent, Virginia. Sold simulcast rights of the Virginia track Colonial Downs to Colonial L.P. for $9.8 million in September 2005 who will have the use of the Colonial Downs signal in both domestic and international distribution network.
 Multnomah Greyhound Park, Wood Village, Oregon. Magna acquired (racing and operating rights) in October 2001 for $1.2 million (20% of sale of Portland Meadows, sale totaling $5.97 million), agreement expired in September 2005.
 The Meadows Racetrack, North Strabane Township, Pennsylvania near Pittsburgh; Magna acquired in April 2001 for $53 million, sold to Millennium Gaming, Inc. for a total of $225 million in November 2006. Magna has agreement to manage racing operations for 5 years.
 San Luis Rey Downs Training Center, Bonsall, California a  horse racing training facility that was sold by Magna in June 2007 for $24 million to M.I. Developments which plan to make residential developments within three years.
 Great Lakes Downs, Muskegon, Michigan.  Acquired in February 2000 for 267,000 Shares of Class A Voting Stock in Magna Entertainment.  Magna had closed the track in November 2007, and sold the property to the Little River Band of Ottawa Indians in July 2008 for $5.9 million.  The tribe is redeveloping the property, with plans to build a casino.
 Magna Racino, Ebreichsdorf, Austria. Built and opened in April 2004, Magna has agreed to sell to Sakoyah Beteiligungsverwaltungs GmbH, Vienna for just short of €40 million in September 2020.
 Remington Park, Oklahoma City, Oklahoma.  Acquired in for $10 million in February 2000, Magna has agreed to sell to Global Gaming, RP (owned by the Chickasaw Nation tribe) for $80.25 million in September 2009 (sale has not formally closed).
 Ocala Meadows, Ocala, Florida. Magna has agreed in September 2009 to sell  near Interstate 75 for $8.1 million (sale has not formally closed).
  land, Romulus, Michigan. Magna purchased this property in September 2002 and sold it some time in 2008 for $28 million.
 Thistledown Racecourse, North Randall, Ohio.  Acquired in October 1999 for $14 million, sold to Harrah's Entertainment in September 2009 for $43 million (sale closed 07/28/10).
 Lone Star Park, Grand Prairie, Texas.  Acquired in October 2002 (Owns racing and operating assets) for $100 million has agreed to sell to Global Gaming, RP (owned by the Chickasaw Nation) for $27 million in September 2009 (sale has been delayed by the Delaware bankruptcy judge due to a competing bid by Penn National Gaming.)
 Horse Racing TV was a premium television network featuring racing from both Stronach Group tracks and other participating tracks. In 2007, Magna sold 50% of Horse Racing TV to Churchill Downs Incorporated. In February 2015, HRTV was acquired by Betfair, owner of the competing TVG Network, and rebranded TVG2.

References 

 
Gambling companies of Canada
Horse racing companies
Horse racing venue owners
Privately held companies of Canada